Guye is a district of the city of Tangshan, Hebei province, People's Republic of China.

Administrative divisions

Subdistricts:
Tangjiazhuang Subdistrict, Zhaogezhuang Subdistrict, Linxi Subdistrict, Guye Subdistrict, Nanfangezhuang Subdistrict, Lüjiatuo Subdistrict

Townships:
Wangnianzhuang Township, Beijiadian Township, Fangezhuang Township, Dazhuangtuo Township, Xijiatao Township

References

External links

County-level divisions of Hebei
Tangshan